"In My Youth" is a song by Australian rock-pop band Noiseworks. It was released in August 1989 as the fourth and final single from their second studio album Touch (1988) and peaked at number 44 on the ARIA singles chart.

Track listing
7" vinyl / CD single (655107 7)

Charts

External links
 https://www.discogs.com/Noiseworks-In-My-Youth/master/410202

References

Noiseworks songs
1988 songs
1989 singles
CBS Records singles
Songs written by Justin Stanley
Songs written by Jon Stevens